Same-sex marriage in Santa Catarina has been legal since April 29, 2013. Santa Catarina was one of the twelve Brazilian states to have opened marriage to same-sex couples before its nationwide legalisation in May 2013. Civil unions (união estável) have also been available since 2011 in accordance with a ruling from the Supreme Federal Court.

Legal history
On April 29, 2013, Judge Vanderlei Romer from the state's Judicial Administrative Department ruled that all notaries statewide are obligated to issue marriage licences to same-sex couples, and convert civil unions into marriages if the couples so choose. This decision legalized same-sex marriage in Santa Catarina.

In August 2013, a Florianópolis prosecutor, Henrique Limongi, received considerable media attention after publicly stating that he would refuse to issue marriage licenses to same-sex couples in violation of state and federal law. Under Brazilian law, judges and notaries are prohibited from refusing to register and license same-sex marriages. Limongi falsely argued that recognizing same-sex marriages violated the Constitution of Brazil. From 2013 to 2018, he personally requested the annulment of 112 same-sex marriages. Lawyers representing some of the involved couples have labelled his arguments "baseless", as the Brazilian judiciary itself has held that same-sex marriage does not violate the Constitution; on the contrary, it requires its recognition. Official investigations alleging "public misconduct", "disrespect for legal hierarchy" and "placing personal beliefs above the law" were launched by the Public Ministry National Council (CNMP; Conselho Nacional do Ministério Público) and the Brazilian Bar Association (Ordem dos Advogados do Brasil). In July 2020, the CNMP decided not to bring disciplinary charges against Limongi but recommend his removal from office. In August 2020, the Public Ministry of Santa Catarina removed Limongi from his post as a marriage officer and reassigned him to a new post, effective from 1 September. His replacement, Vânia Sangalli, said she would perform same-sex marriages. In September 2020, the Santa Catarina Court of Justice ruled that 46 same-sex marriages Limongi had filed official objections to in 2019 were legal.

Marriage statistics
The following table shows the number of same-sex marriages performed in Santa Catarina according to the Brazilian Institute of Geography and Statistics.

Figures for 2020 are lower than previous years because of the restrictions in place due to the COVID-19 pandemic.

See also
Same-sex marriage in Brazil

References

Same-sex marriage in Brazil
Santa Catarina (state)
Same-sex marriage by country subdivision
2013 in LGBT history